Bill Hinds (born April 21, 1950, in Houston, Texas) is an American sports cartoonist, whose work includes the sports cartoon feature Buzz Beamer, and the syndicated comic strips Cleats and Tank McNamara.

Career 
Hinds illustrated Tank McNamara with co-creator and writer Jeff Millar from 1974 to 2012, when he also took over writing due to Millar's failing health.

His work featuring Buzz Beamer appears each month in Sports Illustrated Kids. His drawings can also be found on the magazine's website, on which his characters also appear in games and animated cartoons.

Hinds is a graduate of Stephen F. Austin University and has held seats on the National Cartoonists Society and the Newspaper Features Council.

Personal life 
Hinds lives with his wife, Lisa, and their three children (Sam, Hannah and Grace) in Spring, Texas.

Awards 
Hinds received the National Cartoonist Society divisional award for Sports Cartoons in 1986 and their New Media Award in 2000.  He received an additional nomination for the New Media Award in 2002.

References

External links
NCS Awards
Amuniversal.com

American comic strip cartoonists
Living people
1950 births
People from Houston
People from Spring, Texas
Artists from Texas